"Dreams In My Head" is the lead single from In Swings the Tide, New Zealand singer-songwriter Anika Moa's third studio album. It was released on 8 October 2007.

A New Zealand Herald review of the album said it "soon finds its feet on the lush single Dreams In My Head." The tune was nominated in 2008 for an APRA Silver Scroll Award.

Chart performance
"Dreams In My Head" entered the New Zealand Singles Chart on 15 October 2007, a week after its release, at No. 17. It peaked at No. 16. The single remained in the chart for a total of 18 consecutive weeks.

References

2007 singles
2007 songs
Anika Moa songs
EMI Records singles